The 2024 NCAA Division I Cross Country Championships will be the 86th annual NCAA Men's Division I Cross Country Championship and the 44th annual NCAA Women's Division I Cross Country Championship to determine the team and individual national champions of NCAA Division Imen's and women's collegiate cross country running in the United States.

These championships will be hosted by the University of Wisconsin - Madison at the Thomas Zimmer Championship Course in Madison, Wisconsin.

In all, four different titles will be contested: men's and women's individual and team championships.

Women's Team Result (Top 10)

Women's Individual Result (Top 10)

Men's Team Result (Top 10)

Men's Individual Result (Top 10)

See also 

 NCAA Men's Division II Cross Country Championship
 NCAA Women's Division II Cross Country Championship
 NCAA Men's Division III Cross Country Championship
 NCAA Women's Division III Cross Country Championship

References 

Sports in Madison, Wisconsin
NCAA Cross Country Championships
NCAA Division I Cross Country Championships
NCAA Division I Cross Country Championships
Track and field in Wisconsin